The American Journal of Psychiatry is a monthly peer-reviewed medical journal covering all aspects of psychiatry, and is the official journal of the American Psychiatric Association. The first volume was issued in 1844, at which time it was known as the American Journal of Insanity. The title changed to the current form with the July issue of 1921.

According to the Journal Citation Reports, the journal has a 2020 impact factor of 18.112.

Ethical concerns
Several complaints, including legal cases, have charged The American Journal of Psychiatry with being complicit in pharmaceutical industry corruption of clinical trial results.  In a Department of Justice case against Forest Pharmaceuticals, Forest pleaded guilty to the charges of misbranding the drug Celexa (citalopram). The Complaint in Intervention clearly identifies a 2004 ghostwritten article published in ‘’The American Journal of Psychiatry in the names of Wagner et al.'' as a part of this illegal marketing of Celexa for pediatric depression.

See also
 List of psychiatry journals

References

External links
 

Psychiatry journals
Monthly journals
Publications established in 1844
English-language journals
American Psychiatric Association academic journals